Puliyur is a panchayat town in Karur district in the Indian state of Tamil Nadu.

Geography
It has an average elevation of 106 metres (347 feet) .

Demographics
 India census, Puliyur had a population of 10,845. Males constitute 51% of the population and females 49%. Puliyur has an average literacy rate of 69%, higher than the national average of 59.5%: male literacy is 79%, and female literacy is 59%. In Puliyur, 10% of the population is under 6 years of age.

Industries
Chettinad Cement Corporation Ltd has a Cement plant in Puliyur, established in 1961, majority of the populace is from the township of the company. A modern residential school and engineering college are being run by the company.

References

Cities and towns in Karur district